Carex markgrafii is a tussock-forming perennial in the family Cyperaceae. It is native to parts of Albania.

See also
 List of Carex species

References

markgrafii
Plants described in 1926
Taxa named by Georg Kükenthal
Flora of Albania